Earnscliffe is a Victorian manor in Ottawa, Ontario, built in the Gothic Revival style. During the late 19th century, it was home to Canada's first Prime Minister, Sir John A. Macdonald. Since 1930, it has served as the residence of the British High Commissioner to Canada.

Location and heritage status

The property overlooks the Ottawa River, just east of the Macdonald-Cartier Bridge. It is located to the northwest of Sussex Drive, across from the Lester B. Pearson Building.

The house is a National Historic Site and the location of a plaque erected by the Historic Sites and Monuments Board of Canada. However, since it is a diplomatic residence, it is closed to visitors except for special public events, such as Doors Open Ottawa. It was designated as "Earnscliffe National Historic Site of Canada" on May 30, 1960.

History

The manor was built by Thomas McKay's company for his son-in-law, John McKinnon, from 1855 to 1857. McKinnon died suddenly in 1866 and the house was purchased by another of McKay's sons-in-law, Thomas Keefer. Two years later, he sold it to Thomas Reynolds, a railroad developer. Reynolds resided there for several years, and it was during this period that the house got the name Earnscliffe, an archaic term for "eagle's cliff".

Reynolds died in 1879, and his son sold the house to Sir John A. Macdonald in 1883. Macdonald had earlier stayed with Reynolds, and there are some stories that he gave it its name. When Sir John A. Macdonald visited, they discussed about its name as Eaglescliffe, but he suggested the Old English word for eagle, and his suggestion was accepted. In 1888, Macdonald made several additions to the structure. In 1891, Macdonald fell ill, and he died in his room at Earnscliffe.

His widow, Lady Macdonald, briefly continued to reside in the home after his death, and Queen Victoria made her Baroness Macdonald of Earnscliffe. Soon, however, Lady Macdonald and her daughter departed for England and leased the house to Lord Treowen, commander of the militia. Over the next decades, the building was home to several local notables, including Mrs. Charles A.E. Harriss.

In 1930, William Henry Clark, the first British high commissioner to Canada, arranged to buy the house for the British government. It has been the home of the British high commissioner ever since.

In 2005, a plaque and tree was installed on the grounds of Earnscliffe, in commemoration of the CANLOAN program and its participants.

On October 4, 2011, a fire damaged the building. British High Commissioner Andrew Pocock, living in the house at the time, was fine and no one was injured in the fire.

See also
 British High Commission, Ottawa
 List of designated heritage properties in Ottawa

References

External links
1955 booklet outlining the history of the building (pdf)

Diplomatic residences in Ottawa
Gothic Revival architecture in Ottawa
Canada–United Kingdom relations
National Historic Sites in Ontario
Houses completed in 1855
John A. Macdonald
Designated heritage properties in Ottawa
Sussex Drive